Judge Brewster may refer to:

Elisha Hume Brewster (1871–1946), judge of the United States District Court for the District of Massachusetts
Leo Brewster (1903–1979), judge of the United States District Court for the Northern District of Texas
Rudi M. Brewster (1932–2012), judge of the United States District Court for the Southern District of California